The 2009 Krasnozavodsk tornado was an F3 tornado that occurred on Junе 3, 2009, in Krasnozavodsk near Sergiev Posad in the Moscow region at 22.15 MST. It was the first powerful tornado in the vicinity of Moscow since 1984. By damage registered in photo and video materials, this tornado is categorised at F2 at its rise, and at F3 at maximum stage.

Synopsis
Late on June 3, 2009, a cold-core non-tropical low pressure area located over the Baltic Sea collided with a warm air mass, creating atmospheric instability. The result was a line of severe thunderstorms, also known as a squall line, in the Moscow area. The tornado reached F3 intensity along its path. The tornado was the first intense tornado to impact the Moscow region in nearly 25 years. This is roughly half the monthly rainfall average.

Impact
The tornado damaged and destroyed numerous homes within the Moscow region. The most severe damage took place in Krasnozavodsk where nine people were reportedly killed, one of whom was later confirmed, and 185 others were injured. The fatality occurred after a boy was pinned underneath a downed tree. Teachers rushed to pull the child from the fallen tree but were unable to free him. Paramedics declared him dead at the scene by the time they arrived. High winds produced by the thunderstorm that spawned the tornado cut power to 40,000 people throughout 250 towns in the area. Live power lines downed by the tornado sparked fires that destroyed ten structures. Damage from the fires amounted to 170 million RUB (US$5.3 million). In Moscow, winds up to  downed 90 trees, damaged 25 advertisement billboards and several homes. Forty-two homes were damaged by the tornado, ranging from roof damage to severe interior damage, 60 vehicles were either thrown or damaged, and 360 trees were uprooted. Damages from the tornado were estimated at 350 million RUB (US$11.3 million).

Aftermath
Following the severe weather, emergency response teams were deployed to the affected regions. Cleanup crews also quickly began to remove debris from roadways and rebuild downed power lines. By June 11, all roads were cleared. By June 14, repairs to the damaged homes were complete as all the roofs were replaced by city officials.

See also
 Tornadoes of 2009
 1904 Moscow tornado
 1984 Yaroslavl tornado
 Climate of Moscow

References

Tornadoes in Russia
Tornadoes of 2009
Krasnozavodsk Tornado
June 2009 events in Russia